Wunopito/Wonopito Airport , also known as Lembata Airport, is an airport serving Lewoleba, villages in the district Nubatukan, in the province of East Nusa Tenggara in Indonesia.

Airlines and destinations

References

External links
  Direktorat Jenderal Perhubungan Udara

Flores Island (Indonesia)
Airports in East Nusa Tenggara